Emoia boettgeri, also known commonly as Boettger's emo skink, the Micronesia forest skink, and the Micronesia spotted skink, is a species of lizard in the family Scincidae. The species is native to Micronesia. There are no recognized subspecies.

Etymology
The specific name, boettgeri, is in honor of German herpetologist Oskar Boettger.

Geographic range
E. boettgeri is found in the Caroline Islands and the Marshall Islands in eastern Micronesia

Habitat

Behavior
E. boettgeri is terrestrial.

Reproduction
E. boettgeri is oviparous.

References

Further reading
Goldberg SR (2019). "Emoia boettgeri (Micronesia Spotted Skink). Reproduction". Herpetological Review 50 (2): 373.
Greer AE (1974). "The genetic relationships of the scincid lizard genus Leiolopisma and its relatives". Australian Journal of Zoology Supplemental Series 22 (31): 1–67. (Emoia boettgeri, p. 20).
Sternfeld R (1918). "Zur Tiergeographie Papuasiens und der pazifischen Inselwelt ". Abhandlungen der Senckenbergischen Naturforschenden Gesellschaft 36: 375–436. (Lygosoma boettgeri, new species, pp. 406–407 + Plate 31, figure 4). (in German).

Emoia
Reptiles described in 1918
Taxa named by Richard Sternfeld